Tsvetnopolye is the name of several rural localities in Russia:
Tsvetnopolye, Novosibirsk Oblast, a village in Chistoozyorny District of Novosibirsk Oblast
Tsvetnopolye, Omsk Oblast, a selo in Azovsky Nemetsky National District of Omsk Oblast